The 1989 Seattle Seahawks season was the team's 14th season with the National Football League (NFL). The season marked the end of an era for the team, as the last remaining original Seahawk, longtime wide receiver Steve Largent, retired after playing 14 seasons in the league, all with the Seahawks. At the time of his retirement, he was the NFL's all-time reception leader.

1989 NFL Draft

Personnel

Staff

Final roster

     Starters in bold.
 (*) Denotes players that were selected for the 1990 Pro Bowl.

Schedule

Preseason

Source: Seahawks Media Guides

Regular season
Divisional matchups have the AFC West playing the NFC East.

Bold indicates division opponents.
Source: 1989 NFL season results

Standings

Game Summaries

Preseason

Week P1: at Phoenix Cardinals

Week P2: vs. New England Patriots

Week P3: vs. Detroit Lions

Week P4: vs. San Francisco 49ers

Regular season

Week 1: at Philadelphia Eagles

Week 2: vs. Phoenix Cardinals

Week 3: at New England Patriots

Week 4: at Los Angeles Raiders

Week 5: vs. Kansas City Chiefs

Week 6: at San Diego Chargers

Week 7: vs. Denver Broncos

Week 8: vs. San Diego Chargers

Week 9: at Kansas City Chiefs

Week 10: vs. Cleveland Browns

Week 11: at New York Giants

Week 12: at Denver Broncos

Week 13: vs. Buffalo Bills

Week 14 at Bengals

Week 15: vs. Los Angeles Raiders

Week 16: vs. Washington Redskins

Steve Largent's final game with Seahawks

References

External links
 Seahawks draft history at NFL.com
 1989 NFL season results at NFL.com

Seattle
Seattle Seahawks seasons